Rachel Bay Jones (born November 8, 1969) is an American actress and singer. She has played the roles of Catherine in the 2013 Broadway revival of Pippin and Evan Hansen's mother, Heidi Hansen, in Dear Evan Hansen.  The latter earned her an Emmy Award, a Grammy Award, and the 2017 Tony Award for Best Featured Actress in a Musical.

Early life 
Jones was born in New York City and grew up in Boca Raton, Florida. Her mother is Jewish. Her parents were both Shakespearean actors. She dropped out of high school to perform in a local play, then moved to New York City to pursue acting at 19.

Career 
Jones's first Broadway role was as an understudy for the lead role of Esther in Meet Me in St. Louis in 1989.

In the early 1990s, she was in the touring company of Grand Hotel, as well as other national and international tours, performing Rent in German and Evita in Spanish. She performed in the 2009 Broadway revival of Hair as the replacement for Mother, Buddahdalirama, and Member Of The Tribe. She was one of the original cast members starring in the revival of Pippin, playing Catherine, Pippin's lover, during the entire run.

Jones portrayed Evan's mother Heidi in the musical Dear Evan Hansen, which premiered at the Arena Stage in Washington, D.C. in July 2015. She reprised the role in the Off-Broadway production at the Second Stage Theatre in May 2016, and then on Broadway starting in November 2016. At the 71st Tony Awards, she won for Best Featured Actress in a Musical for her portrayal of Heidi Hansen.

After leaving Dear Evan Hansen on August 5, 2018, Jones performed at several small venues in Something Beautiful, a one-woman cabaret show that draws music from her expansive career and bringing meaning from her life into the lyrics.

In 2018, Jones appeared in the CBS television drama series God Friended Me, playing the role of Susan. She has also had guest roles on Modern Family and Grey's Anatomy.

She appeared in the concert of Sweet Charity at the Merkin Concert Hall at the Kaufman Music Center on June 17, 2019, presented by the Transport Group.

From January 29 to February 3, 2020 she starred as Diana in Next to Normal at the Kennedy Center Broadway Center Stage series.

In 2021, Jones joined the cast of The Good Doctor as Salen Morrison. This reunited her with former Dear Evan Hansen co-star Noah Galvin (who played the title role, the son of Jones's character, Heidi).

Personal life
She has a daughter, Miranda, and is partner to actor Benim Foster. Jones has one sibling, her brother Darren.

Acting credits

Film

Television

Theatre
Source: Internet Broadway Database

Awards and nominations

References

External links
 
 

20th-century American actresses
21st-century American actresses
American musical theatre actresses
American stage actresses
American television actresses
Actresses from Florida
Actresses from New York City
Daytime Emmy Award winners
Grammy Award winners
People from Boca Raton, Florida
Tony Award winners
1969 births
Living people